Mvezo is a small village on the banks of the Mbashe River, not far from Mthatha in the Eastern Cape of South Africa. The village is mainly known as being the birthplace of Nelson Mandela, whose family serves as its chiefly dynasty, and the location of the Nelson Mandela Birthplace Museum.

References

Populated places in the King Sabata Dalindyebo Local Municipality